is the debut album of Lily Chou-Chou, a then-fictional musician created for the 2001 Shunji Iwai film All About Lily Chou-Chou. It was released on October 17, 2001, a week and a half after the film's release in Japan.

Track listing

Chart rankings

Reported sales

Release history

References

2001 albums
2001 soundtrack albums
Drama film soundtracks
Japanese-language albums
Salyu albums
Albums produced by Takeshi Kobayashi